Season eleven of the television program American Experience originally aired on the PBS network in the United States on November 18, 1998 and concluded on May 24, 1999. This is the eleventh season to feature David McCullough as the host, and the winner of the Primetime Emmy Awards. The season contained ten new episodes and began with all four parts of the film America 1900.

Episodes

 Denotes multiple chapters that aired on the same date and share the same episode number

References

1998 American television seasons
1999 American television seasons
American Experience